Daniel Attoumou Amicchia (1908-1994) was a Ghanaian photographer who settled in Grand-Bassam, Côte d'Ivoire.

Early life and career  
Amicchia was introduced to photography in 1920s. He later settled in Grand-Bassam, Côte d'Ivoire in 1948 where he was active until 1970.  In Grand-Bassam, he kept in contact with the English-speaking Ghanaian community in  Côte d'Ivoire whom he photographed extensively. He acted like a 'traveling merchant' and produced photographs of families and businesses. Much is not known about Amicchia's life and career as he was largely undocumented and his family threw away his archives after he passed away.

Amicchia's partner Joseph Ernest Kouao, however, kept and preserve the remnant of the photographer's archive. Revue Noire featured Amicchia's photographs in 1991.  Thereafter, his photographs appeared in many exhibitions in the west

Death 
Amicchia died from cancer in 1994.

References 

Ghanaian photographers
1908 births
1994 deaths